Detroit East Catholic High School (short form: "East Catholic", or "EC") was a co-educational college preparatory school in Detroit, Michigan and belonged to the Roman Catholic Archdiocese of Detroit.

East Catholic was a member of the Michigan High School Athletic Association (MHSAA) and competed athletically in the Catholic High School League (CHSL).

History
The school was formed in 1969 by a merger of St. Anthony High School (Detroit) and some other Catholic schools. In the 1970s it had about 900 students, its peak enrollment. The population decreased since the area's socioeconomic profile became more low income and as Catholic families moved outside of Detroit. By the 2004-2005 school year, the student count was 124.

Athletic accomplishments
The East Catholic Chargers won seven Michigan High School Athletic Association state championships in boys basketball.

Closure
The school was closed in 2005 when Detroit East Catholic, along with St. Florian and Bishop Gallagher, formed Trinity Catholic High School as a collaborative.

References

High schools in Detroit
Defunct Catholic secondary schools in Michigan
Roman Catholic Archdiocese of Detroit
Former high schools in Michigan
 
1969 establishments in Michigan